Brackney may refer to;

 Brackney, California, an unincorporated community in Santa Cruz County
 Brackney, Pennsylvania, an unincorporated community in Susquehanna County
 William H. Brackney (born 1948), a professor and Baptist minister in Nova Scotia

See also
 Brackley, a market town in South Northamptonshire, England